29 Armoured Engineer Squadron is a sub-unit of the British Army's Royal Engineers. The sub-unit provided close support engineering to the Queen's Royal Hussars (Queen's Own and Royal Irish) battlegroup. It is commanded by the 35 Engineer Regiment. It was located in Barker Barracks, Paderborn, Germany until 2019. From October 2011 to May 2012 the sub-unit was deployed on Operation Herrick 15 in Afghanistan.

The Squadron deployed on Op CABRIT 1, NATO's Enhanced Forward Presence in Estonia, in March 2017.

References 

Squadrons of the Royal Engineers